The Amilcar Pégase is a mid-sized car made between 1934 and 1937 by the French Amilcar company.   The 2150 cc 4 cylinder engine placed it in the 12CV car tax band.  Other engine sizes, including a 2490 cc (14CV) unit, were also listed.

The car's introduction coincided with the final chapter of Amilcar's struggle for survival.  After 1935 the Pégase was the manufacturer's only listed model, and by the time it was delisted, the residuum of Amilcar had been absorbed into Hotchkiss.

The Amilcar Pégase was an elegant car, offering a range of bodies that featured the stylish aerodynamic look that became fashionable in the middle 1930s.

Engines
The car was launched with a four-cylinder 2150-cc (12CV) engine produced by Delahaye, and shared with the Delahaye 134N. Top speed would have varied according to the weight and style of the body specified, but a maximum of approximately 130 km/h (81 mph) was quoted.

Plans existed to launch the car with an ohc 2120-cc (12CV) four cylinder unit designed by the manufacturer's own engineer whose name was Grillot, an engine which would have produced the same peak power. In the event it was decided that it would be more cost effective to fit the similarly sized Delahaye engine, however, and it is not clear whether any of the Grillot engined 12CV Pégases were ever offered for sale.

Bodies
Amilcar had no in-house facilities for producing the steel car bodies that had become the norm during the early 1930s, so these would have been supplied by outside contractors, which allowed, at least in theory, for considerable flexibility.   The manufacturer's publicity material presented at the 1935 Paris Motor Show for the 1936 model year held out the promise of no fewer than eleven different body types.   A year later, in October 1936, the number of bodies had been reduced to four, these being the “Skiff” 2-seater roadster, the “Fleuret” 2-door 4-seater cabriolet, the “Amazone” 2-door 4-seater coupé and the “Saint-Hubert” 4-door 4-seater sedan/saloon.   At the motor show in 1936 the 2150cc (12CV) Pégase was priced at 26,900 Francs, while customers content to select from the one of the manufacturer's four standard bodies would find listed prices ranging from 37,900 Francs for the “Amazone” coupé to 42,900 Francs for the “Fleuret” and “Skiff” bodied cars.

Troubled times
The Pégase continued to be produced after the Amilcar plant was closed down in August 1934, presumably from the (very much smaller) premises at Boulogne-Billancourt to which the manufacturer had been obliged to locate.   There were certainly enough cars to make a good showing at the motor show in 1935, though by the time of the 1936 motor show the 14CV engine car was no longer on display.   The Pégase appears to have had no place in the Hotchkiss plans for the Amilcar business, and once Hotchkiss had taken control the Amilcar Pégase was withdrawn from sale.

References

Amilcar vehicles
Cars introduced in 1934